Suck on This is a mixtape by Die Antwoord. It was released on 19 May 2016 as a free digital download. The mixtape serves as a precursor to the band's fourth album, Mount Ninji and da Nice Time Kid.

Track listing

Charts

References

2016 mixtape albums
Die Antwoord albums
Alternative hip hop albums by South African artists
Rave albums